Daniel Fonseca Garis (born 13 September 1969) is a Uruguayan former footballer and a current football agent. A former forward, throughout his playing career, he played for Uruguayan side Nacional, as well as Italian clubs Cagliari, Napoli, Roma, Juventus, and Como, and Argentine side River Plate, winning titles with both Nacional and Juventus. At international level, he represented Uruguay on 30 occasions between 1990 and 1997, scoring 11 goals, and also took part at the 1990 World Cup and the 1995 Copa América, winning the latter tournament.

Club career
Fonseca, nicknamed el castor ("the beaver"), started his football career at Nacional, his local team in Uruguay, in 1988. He played 14 games in two years and scored 3 goals.

In 1990, he moved to Cagliari, scoring 17 goals in 50 appearances, playing mostly on the left rather than in his more habitual central position.

In 1992 Napoli signed him and Fonseca managed a more impressive strike rate, scoring 31 goals in two seasons in Naples, including 5 goals in a 5–1 win against Valencia in the first knock-out round of the UEFA Cup on 16 September 1992. His form and performances drew attention from Roma, who promptly signed him in 1994.

During his time with Napoli, he would occasionally put on the socks of the Uruguay national team, which is a shade lighter in colour than Napoli's socks, saying that they would bring him good luck.

However, his three seasons (from 1994 to 1997) were far from successful. Fonseca usually played as a second striker, supporting the Argentine centre forward Abel Balbo, but, because of the many injuries he suffered, he played discontinuously.

Juventus signed Fonseca in 1997, but he was once again played out of position on the left wing, as he had been at Cagliari and Roma. His goalscoring record in Serie A was very good considering he was not always a first choice player with Roma and Juventus. Fonseca was always regarded as a "super sub", and scored several important goals coming off the bench. During his time with the Turin club, he won one Serie A title, a Champions League runner-up medal and the Supercoppa Italiana.

Injuries ruled him completely out of the 1999–2000 season, (aside from an UEFA Cup match against Levski Sofia on 4 November 1999, which ended in a 1–1 home draw, and a Coppa Italia match against Napoli on 16 December 1999, which ended in a 1–0 home win), which saw him transferred to River Plate in Argentina. There, he infamously played only during the club's 2000 pre-season. His only match was a pre-season encounter against archrivals Boca Juniors, and Fonseca helped his club to earn a win by scoring the final penalty in the shootout. A few days later, Fonseca would resign from his contract and join Como in 2001. He retired in 2003 after the coach told him that he was no longer a part of the first team's plans.

International career
Fonseca represented the Uruguay national football team on 30 occasions between 1990 and 1997, scoring 11 goals. He was a member of the team that took part at the 1990 FIFA World Cup, and was also in the squad that won the 1995 Copa América.

Style of play
Fonseca was a quick, opportunistic, and hard-working striker, with good dribbling skills, vision, and a powerful shot from distance. This made him capable of both scoring goals and creating chances for teammates. A versatile and well-rounded attacker, Fonseca was also effective in the air, and was capable of playing in several offensive positions. His pace, technique, defensive work-rate, and passing ability meant he could play on the left wing, as well as in a central role, or even in a more creative role as a second striker alongside or behind another striker. He was also an accurate penalty kick and set-piece taker. Despite his ability, however, he was also injury prone.

After football
Fonseca currently works as a football agent, and has represented several of his compatriots, including Martín Cáceres, Fernando Muslera, and Luis Suárez.

Personal life
His son Matias is also a footballer.

Controversies

In April 2016, he was named in the Panama Papers.

Honours

Club
Nacional
Recopa Sudamericana: 1989
Copa Interamericana: 1989
Primera División Uruguaya: 2002

Juventus
Serie A: 1997–98
Supercoppa Italiana: 1997, Runner-up: 1998
UEFA Champions League Runner-up: 1997–98
UEFA Intertoto Cup: 1999

International
Uruguay
Copa América: 1995

References

External links
 
 

Uruguayan footballers
Association football forwards
Club Nacional de Football players
Uruguayan Primera División players
Cagliari Calcio players
S.S.C. Napoli players
A.S. Roma players
Juventus F.C. players
Club Atlético River Plate footballers
Expatriate footballers in Argentina
Como 1907 players
Serie A players
Expatriate footballers in Italy
Uruguayan expatriate footballers
Uruguay international footballers
Uruguayan expatriate sportspeople in Italy
1990 FIFA World Cup players
1995 Copa América players
1969 births
Living people
Copa América-winning players
People named in the Panama Papers
Sportspeople from Montevideo